Amy Gerstler (born 1956) is an American poet. She won a Guggenheim Fellowship as well as the National Book Critics Circle Award.

Biography 
Amy Gerstler was born in 1956. She is a graduate of Pitzer College and holds an M.F.A. from Bennington College. She is now a professor in the MFA writing program at the University of California, Irvine.  Previously, she taught in the Bennington Writing Seminars program, at Art Center College of Design in Pasadena, California and the University of Southern California's Master of Professional Writing Program.

Gerstler was editor of the 2010 edition of the anthology Best American Poetry.  She is also the author of art reviews, book reviews, fiction, and occasional journalistic essays.  She has collaborated with visual artists, including Alexis Smith, and her writing has been published in numerous exhibition catalogs.

Her books of poetry include Medicine - finalist for the Phi Beta Kappa Poetry Award, and Bitter Angel (1990) - winner of the 1990 National Book Critics Circle Award.

Described by the Los Angeles Times as "one of the best poets in the nation,"  her 2009 book, Dearest Creature, was named one of the notable books of the year by the New York Times.

Scattered at Sea, her 2015 collection, was longlisted for the National Book Award.

She is married to artist and author Benjamin Weissman.  She lives in Los Angeles, California.

Works
 Index of Women New York: Penguin Books, 2021. 
Scattered at Sea, New York : Penguin Books, 2015.  014312689X, OCLC 892458622
Dearest Creature, New York : Penguin Books, 2009. , 
 Ghost Girl   	New York : Penguin Books, 2004. ,  
 Medicine  New York : Penguin, 2000. , 
 Crown of Weeds New York : Penguin Books, 1997. , 
 Nerve Storm New York : Penguin Books, 1993.  , 
 Bitter Angel  Pittsburgh, Pa. Carnegie Mellon University Press 1997. ,  
 The True Bride Santa Monica : Lapis Press, 1986. , 
 White marriage ; & Recovery, Los Angeles, Calif. : Illuminati, 1984. ,

References

External links
Amy Gerstler, poets.org

1956 births
Living people
Bennington College alumni
Pitzer College alumni
Art Center College of Design people
American women poets
21st-century American women